Birtle-Russell is a former provincial electoral division in Manitoba, Canada.

Birtle-Russell was established in 1957, created by the first Independent Boundaries Commission in Manitoba. It was located in the western part of the province, on the border with Saskatchewan. It included the area around the towns of Birtle and Russell. Political power in the area shifted between the Progressive Conservatives and the Liberal-Progressives and Liberals until 1969. When the New Democratic Party first came to office the area became a Progressive Conservative stronghold.

Provincial representatives

Election results

References

Former provincial electoral districts of Manitoba
1957 establishments in Manitoba
1969 disestablishments in Manitoba